Tarek Mitri (born 16 September 1950) is a Lebanese university professor, independent politician and former government minister.

Early life and education
Mitri was born on 16 September 1950. He has a PhD. in political science from the University of Paris X.

Career
Dr Tarek Mitri is the President of St George University of Beirut. 

He was director of the Issam Fares Institute on Public Policy and International Affairs at the American University of Beirut (2014-2019). 

He served as the Special Representative of the UN Secretary General, 2012- 2014. 

From 2005 to 2011, he was member of four successive Lebanese governments as Minister of Environment, Administrative Reform, Culture, Information and acting Minister of Foreign Affairs. 

Previously, he worked in the World Council of Churches in Geneva and held various positions in ecumenical organizations, responsible of Christian-Muslim relations, intercultural and interreligious dialogue. 

He taught at the Université Saint Joseph, Balamand University, the University of Geneva, Amsterdam Free University, Harvard University and the American University of Beirut. 

He chairs the Boards of Nicolas Sursock Museum and the Institute of Palestine Studies. He is a board member of the Arab Center for Research and Policy Studies. 

He authored a number of books and articles on contemporary Arab issues, religion and politics, interreligious and intercultural dialogue.

Views
Mitri states his role is more as an advocate for the intellectuals and the artists along with their freedom of expression and thought. He has also known to be a staunch advocate for Lebanese unity.

Books

 The War on Lebanon, The story of UNSC Resolution 1701, Arab Center for Research, 2022
 Les chemins rudes, deux ans en Libye, Dar Riad al Rayiss, 2015.
 "Madinah ala Jabal". Dar Annahar, Beirut. 2004
 Au nom de la Bible, au nom de l'Amérique. Labor et Fides. 2004. (ISBN 2830911385) - (ISBN 978-2830911381).
 (Ed.) Religion Law and Society, A Christian-Muslim Discussion, WCC/KOK Pharos, Geneva/Amsterdam, 1995.
 (Ed.) Religion and Human Rights, A Christian-Muslim Discussion, WCC, Geneva, 1997.

References

1950 births
Living people
Culture ministers of Lebanon
Environment ministers of Lebanon
Foreign ministers of Lebanon
Information ministers of Lebanon
Greek Orthodox Christians from Lebanon
Eastern Orthodox Christians from Lebanon
Academic staff of Saint Joseph University
American University of Beirut alumni
University of Paris alumni
Special Representatives of the Secretary-General of the United Nations
Special Envoys of the Secretary-General of the United Nations